There are four classes of road tunnels in China by length. 
 Super-long tunnel (>3,000m) 
 Long tunnel (1,000m-3,000m) 
 Middle-tunnel (250m-1,000m) 
 Short tunnel (<250m)

By 2012, there are 10,022 road tunnels and 8,052.7 km in total length in Mainland China, including 441 super-long tunnels with 1,984.8 km in total length and 1,944 long tunnels with 3,304.4 km in total length.

Notes

References 

 Long
China, Road tunnels
China, long
Tunnels, road, long
Road tunnels